Spin parameter may refer to one of several different parameters in physics.

Black hole physics 
One of two dimensionless parameters relating to black holes:
 The spin parameter of an individual black hole, a variable with a value ranging from 0 to 1
 The effective inspiral spin parameter for a pair of merging black holes, a variable with a value ranging from −1 to 1

Particle physics 